Virginia DeJohn Anderson is an American historian. She is professor of history at the University of Colorado Boulder and the author of three books: New England's Generation: The Great Migration and the Formation of Society and Culture in the Seventeenth Century (Cambridge University Press, 1991), Creatures of Empire:  How Domestic Animals Transformed Early America (Oxford University Press, 2004), and The Martyr and the Traitor: Nathan Hale, Moses Dunbar, and the American Revolution (Oxford University Press, 2017).

Anderson earned a BA summa cum laude from the University of Connecticut and then, on a Marshall Scholarship, an MA from the University of East Anglia in Norwich, England. She earned an AM and PhD from Harvard University.

References

Year of birth missing (living people)
Living people
University of Connecticut alumni
Alumni of the University of East Anglia
Harvard University alumni
University of Colorado Boulder faculty
American historians
Historians of the United States